Joe Brown (February 11, 1884 in New York City - October 13, 1965 in Hollywood, California) was an American actor. He is best remembered for roles in films such as Me, Gangster (1928), Sunny Side Up (1929), Protection (1929), Born Reckless (1930) and Charlie Chan's Chance (1932).

References

External links
 

American male film actors
1884 births
1965 deaths
Male actors from New York City
20th-century American male actors